The 1998 Havant Borough Council election took place on 7 May 1998 to elect members of Havant Borough Council in Hampshire, England. One third of the council was up for election and the council stayed under no overall control.

After the election, the composition of the council was
Liberal Democrats 14
Conservative 14
Labour 8
Independent 3
Others 3

Election result
Overall turnout at the election was 28%.

References

1998 English local elections
Havant Borough Council elections
1990s in Hampshire